The 2010–11 Serie D was the sixty-third edition of the top level Italian non-professional football championship. It represented the fifth tier in the Italian football league system. It originally consisted of 166 teams, with two divisions allocated 20 teams each while the other seven allocated 18 teams. After the first matchday, another team was added, increasing the number of teams to 167 and Girone I to 19 teams.

Each team played two matches against every other team in its own division; a total of 34 matches for the six divisions of 18 teams, 36 matches for the 19-team Girone I,  and 38 matches for the 20-team Girone A & F.

Promotions
The nine division winners and the winner of play off are automatically promoted to Lega Pro Seconda Divisione 2011–12.

On April 10, 2011 Perugia became the first team to be promoted from Serie D in the season, winning the Girone E with three weeks remaining in the schedule, after a 3–2 home victory over Castel Rigone.

This was followed one week later by Cuneo and Mantova that won Girone A and B respectively.

On May 1, 2011 Treviso, Borgo a Buggiano, Santarcangelo, Arzanese won Girone C, D, F and H  respectively.

On May 8, 2011 Aprilia and Ebolitana won Girone G and I respectively.

On June 25, 2011 Rimini was also promoted as the winner of the play off.

Playoffs
Teams placed second through fifth in each division enter a playoff tournament after the regular season where, eventually, three of the four semi-finalists of the final phase emerge. The fourth semi-finalist is the winner (or the final loser if the winner is already promoted) of Coppa Italia Serie D. A final match, between the winners of the semifinals, determines which team finishes first and which teams comes in second in this 37-team playoff. Eventually these teams may be included up to Lega Pro Seconda Divisione if one or more current teams runs into financial difficulties and so are not admitted in this league.

Relegations Playout
 In Gironi B-C-D-E-G-H of 18 teams, the two last-placed teams (17th and 18th) are relegated directly.  
Teams ranked 13th to 16th play a two-legged playout (13th vs 16th, and 14th vs 15th) where to two losers are also relegated.  If the 13th-placed is more than 8 points ahead of the 16th-placed team and/or the 14th-placed team is more than 8 points ahead of the 15th-placed team, then in each case, no playout is played and the lower-classified team is relegated directly.

 In Girone I of 19 teams, the two last-placed teams (18th and 19th) are relegated directly. The same playout rules as above apply, however the teams involved are placed 14th, 15th, 16th and 17th.
 In Gironi A–F of 20 teams, the two last-placed teams (19th and 20th) are relegated directly. The same playout rules as above apply, however the teams involved are placed 15th, 16th, 17th and 18th.

The two losers of the playout are relegated to Eccellenza, while the two winners remain in Serie D. In total, 36 teams are relegated to Eccellenza.

Tie-Breakers

If, during the regular season, two teams finish in an aggregate tie for first, fifth, or in a position where only one team is directly relegated or only one team must play in the playouts, then a tie breaker will be scheduled on neutral ground.

Scudetto Dilettanti
The nine division winners enter a tournament to determine the over-all Serie D champion and is awarded the Scudetto Dilettanti.

In this season the winner was Cuneo.

Events

Start of season
Given a normal season where there are no team failures and special promotions, Serie D would feature 9 teams that had been relegated from Lega Pro Seconda Divisione, 36 teams that had been promoted from Eccellenza, and 117 teams had played in Serie D the year before. Due to twenty-one bankruptcies and non-admissions in the professional leagues above Serie D and five bankruptcies or promotions to fill vacancies in Serie D, the 2010–11 season was to feature only 1 team that played in 2009–10 Lega Pro Seconda Divisione, 45 teams that played in 2009–10 Eccellenza, 1 team that played in Promozione 2009–10 and 115 teams that played in 2009–10 Serie D. The league also admitted four of the teams that had failed in the senior leagues. Mantova (Girone B), which played in 2009–10 Serie B, Arezzo (Girone E), Perugia (Girone E) and Rimini (Girone F) which all played in 2009–10 Lega Pro Prima Divisione. The league admitted twenty teams from Eccellenza to fill vacancies created. These teams are:

 Derthona which finished 16th in Serie D 2009–10 Girone A
 Fiorenzuola which finished 14th in Serie D 2009–10 Girone B
 Montecchio Maggiore which finished 20th in Serie D 2009–10 Girone C
 Castel San Pietro which finished 17th in Serie D 2009–10 Girone D
 Monteriggioni which finished 15th in Serie D 2009–10 Girone E
 Sporting Terni which finished 16th in Serie D 2009–10 Girone E
 Arzachena which finished 16th in Serie D 2009–10 Girone G
 Bacoli Sibilla which 15th finished in Serie D 2009–10 Girone H
 ASD Francavilla which finished 18th in Serie D 2009–10 Girone H
 Santhià which finished 2nd in Eccellenza Piemonte - Valle D'Aosta 2009–10 Girone A and was eliminated in the national playoff
 Castelnuovo Sandrà which finished 2nd in Eccellenza Veneto 2009–10 Girone A and was eliminated in the national playoff
 Novese which finished 2nd in Eccellenza Piemonte - Valle D'Aosta 2009–10-Girone B and was eliminated in the national playoff
 Voluntas Spoleto which finished 3rd in Eccellenza Umbria 2009–10 and was eliminated in the national playoff
 Jesina which finished 4th in Eccellenza Marche 2009–10 and was eliminated in the national playoff
 Camaiore which finished 5th in Eccellenza Toscana 2009–10-Girone A and was eliminated in the national playoff
 Virtus Pavullese which finished 2nd in Eccellenza Emilia-Romagna 2009–10 Girone A and was eliminated in the national playoff
 Castiadas which finished 4th in Eccellenza Sardegna 2009–10 and was eliminated in the national playoff
 Arzanese which finished 3rd in Eccellenza Campania 2009–10 Girone A and was eliminated in the national playoff
 Noto which finished 2nd in Eccellenza Sicilia 2009–10 Girone B and was eliminated in the national playoff
 Treviso which finished 7th in Eccellenza Veneto 2009–10 Girone B
 Gallaratese which finished 8th in Promozione Lombardia 2009–10 Girone A and merged with F.B.C. Saronno in order to play in Serie D.
 After the first match day Real Nocera (formerly Vis Nocera Superiore), which finished 3rd in Eccellenza Campania 2009–10 Girone B and was eliminated in the national playoff, was also admitted.

Standings

Girone A

 Teams 
Teams from Aosta Valley, Piedmont, Liguria, & Lombardy

 League table 

Girone B

 Teams 
Teams from Lombardy, Veneto & Trentino-Alto Adige/Südtirol

 League table 

Girone C

Teams
Teams from Veneto & Friuli-Venezia Giulia

League table

Girone D

Teams
Teams from Lombardy, Emilia-Romagna & Tuscany

League table

Girone E

 Teams 
Teams from Tuscany, Umbria & Lazio

League table

Girone F

Teams
Teams from Emilia-Romagna, Marche, Abruzzo & Molise

League table

Girone G

Teams
Teams from Campania, Lazio & Sardinia

League table

Girone H

Teams
Teams from Campania, Apulia, Lazio & Basilicata

League table

Girone I

Teams
Teams from Campania, Calabria, & Sicily

League table

Division promotions
All teams promoted to Lega Pro Seconda Divisione 2011–12.

Scudetto Dilettanti

First round
division winners placed into 3 groups of 3
group winners and best second-placed team qualify for semi-finals

Group 1

Group 2

Group 3

Arzanese  wins Group 3 for better position than Ebolitana in Coppa Disciplina

Semi-finalsOne leg played June 9, 2011On neutral ground at Treviso, Stadio Omobono Tenni

On neutral ground at Treviso, Stadio Omobono Tenni

FinalPlayed on June 11, 2011On neutral ground at Treviso, Stadio Omobono TenniWinner: CuneoTie-breakers

 Before the promotion playoffs and relegation playout could begin, three tie-breakers needed to be played.Girone B − 5th−6th place − Played on May 15, 2011The winner Olginatese qualified for the promotion playoffs and the loser Legnago remained in Serie D.Girone G − 16th−17th place − Played on May 15, 2011The winner Sanluri qualified for the relegation playout and the loser Tavolara relegated to Eccellenza.Girone H − 12th−13th place − Played on May 15, 2011The winner Grottaglie remained in Serie D and the loser Sant'Antonio Abate forced to play in relegation playout.

Promotion playoffs

Promotion playoffs involved a total of 37 teams; four from each of the nine Serie D divisions (teams placed from 2nd through to 5th) with the Coppa Italia Serie D winner that is directly admitted to the Semi-final round. In this season is qualified the finalist Turris, because the winner Perugia is already promoted in Lega Pro Seconda Divisione.

Rules

 The first two rounds were one-legged matches played in the home field of the best-placed team.
 The games ending in ties were extended to extra time. The higher classified team was declared the winner if the game was still tied after extra time.  Penalty kicks were not taken.
 Round one matched 2nd & 5th-placed teams (2nd & 6th in Girone I), and 3rd & 4th-placed teams within each division.
 The two winners from each division played each other in the second round.
 The nine winners − one each from the nine Serie D divisions − were then split into three groups of three teams each.  Every team played two matches, one against each of the other two opponents within the group.  The three group winners qualified for the semifinal round, joining Turris.
 The semi-finals were two-legged matches, and the respective winners moved on to play in a one-legged final hosted in a neutral ground.
 The winner Rimini is promoted to Lega Pro Seconda Divisione.
 The tournament results provided a list, starting with the finalist Turris, by which vacancies could be filled in Lega Pro Seconda Divisione.

First roundPlayed on May 15 (May 18 for Girone B), 2011Single-legged matches played at best placed club home field: 2nd-placed team plays home 5th-placed team (6th in Girone I), 3rd-placed team plays home 4th placed team
Games ending in a tie are extended to extra time, if still tied, the higher-classified team wins

Second roundPlayed on May 22, 2011 
Single-legged matches played at best placed club home field
Games ending in a tie are extended to extra time, if still tied, the higher-classified team wins

Third round
group winners qualify for semi-finals

Triangular 1

SandonàJesolo wins Triangular 1 for better position than Bacoli Sibilla in Coppa Disciplina

Triangular 2

Triangular 3

Semi-finals Promotion
First legs played June 15, 2011; return legs played June 19, 2011

Turris qualified directly as finalist of Coppa Italia Serie D, because the winner, Perugia, was directly promoted as Girone winner

Final Promotion
Played on June 25, 2011
On neutral ground at Terni, Stadio Libero LiberatiWinner: RiminiRelegation playoutPlayed on May 22 & May 29, 2011'''In case of aggregate tie score, higher classified team wins, without extra time being playedTeam highlighted in green is saved, other is relegated to Eccellenza''

Footnotes

Serie D seasons
5